Dr. Velagapalli Varaprasada Rao is an Indian politician and a sitting Member of Parliament of the 16th Lok Sabha from Tirupati (Lok Sabha constituency), Andhra Pradesh. He won the Indian general election, 2014 being a Yuvajana Sramika Rythu Congress Party candidate.

Dr. V. V. Rao was born 15 May 1953. He was an Indian Administrative Service (IAS) officer from the 1983 batch of the Tamilnadu Cadre. During his tenure in the civil services, he held several top positions, including that of Principal Secretary to Government of Tamil Nadu, Chennai. In 2009, he opted for voluntary retirement to enter politics and serve the people of his native state, Andhra Pradesh.

In 2019 assembly election, Dr. V. Varaprasada Rao was elected as an MLA for Gudur Constituency in Andhra Pradesh (AP). He represents the YSRCP party. Formerly, he was an MP from the Tirupati Constituency. He resigned from this post last year as the Central Government denied special category status to AP.

Education 
After completing his undergraduate course (B.Sc.) in Botany/Zoology at Noble College, Machilipatnam, Dr. Varaprasada Rao pursued a post-graduate course in Biochemistry from Andhra University, Vizag. He then went on to complete his Ph.D. in Biochemistry from the same university.

Dr. Rao has also completed a one year program in administration in the UK.

Career 
Before joining the Indian Administrative Services, Dr. Varaprasada Rao, worked in myriad roles:

 
During his 24 year stint (1983–2007) in the IAS, Dr. Varaprasada Rao worked in various capacities and held several prominent posts in departments like Information and Tourism, Small Industries, Industries and Education. As Managing Director, he was pivotal in turning around the losses of many companies and putting them back on course. The state owned Co-optex (Textiles) for instance was in a financial crisis and operating at a loss of Rs.80 crores until Mr. Varaprasada Rao took over the reins and turned around the fortunes and generated profits.

Similarly, when he was appointed the Managing Director of Salt Corporation, he had a challenging role to play. The corporation was in the doldrums and on the brink of closure. Dr. Varaprasada Rao, with his foresight and progressive policies, saved the company from sinking.

Important posts held in IAS Cadre 

 Sub Collector and District Collector – Kanchipuram/Tiruvallur & Pudukottai districts
 State Protocol Officer, Government of Tamil Nadu
 On deputation to Department of Atomic Energy
 Commissioner of 
 Tourism Department
 Labour Department
 SC/ST Welfare Department
 Land Administration Department (additional)
 Land Reforms Department
 Chairman and/or Managing Director of
 Pumpuhar Shipping Corporation
 Tourism Development Corporation
 Explosives Corporation
 Co-optex (Textiles) 
 Tansi (Small Industries)
 Tamilnadu Slum Clearance Board

After quitting the IAS, Dr Varaprasada Rao was the CEO of 7 Hills Hospital in Andheri (E), Mumbai. Here, he played a major role in expanding the facilities to a 1500-bed hospital.

Personal life 
Dr. V. Varaprasada Rao, is the son of Mr. V. Chiranjeevulu who served as Village President, Pasarlapudi Village.  Chiranjeevulu was also Member, Panchayat Union and Member, Zilla Parishad, Krishna District in Andhra Pradesh. Dr. V.Varaprasada Rao is married to K. Lakshmi M.Sc.(VRS),  Ex- Officer, Bank Of Baroda.

They have a son - Mr. Naveen Gupta, MBA, IIM (A) who is self-employed and is running Health Clinics and schools in Chennai.  His daughter Dr. Spoorthi, MD(ABIM), FACP returned from USA after 18 years. She is self-employed and runs a hospital.

Social work 
Dr Varaprasada Rao was always driven to work for the cause of humanity. After his voluntary retirement from the IAS, Dr Varaprasada Rao dedicated his time to community and social service. He spearheaded and initiated several projects for the welfare of the economically underprivileged.

 In 2012, he donated Rs.15 lakhs for constructing a building in Noble College, Machilipatinam, Andhra Pradesh, his alma mater.
 Constructed an elementary school building at a cost of Rs. 4.00 lakhs at his native place in Kommalamudi Village, Krishna District, Andhra Pradesh. The school is currently run by the Government.
 Donated Rs. 50,000/- each for the refurbishment of worshipping places/community centers/statues at the following places.
 Gunnanapudi, Krishna District
 Lellapudi, Krishna District
 Golvepalli, Krishna District
 Chintalapudi, Krishna District
 Moturu, Krishna District
 Gudivada Community Centre, Krishna District
 Gudivada Church, Krishna District
 Akiveedu Church, Krishna District
 Conducted and funded 6 marriages in the last two years at a cost of about Rs. 2.00 Lakhs
 Currently he is supporting the education of three poor boys and one poor girl who are pursuing Engineering, B.Com., Plus 2 and  5th standard respectively.
 He also adopted a minor boy who was condemned to life-imprisonment. He reformed him completely and gave him a life of dignity.  The boy is now a young man of 30 years who has joined the mainstream of life—married with a family.
 He has helped hundreds of students from different communities coming from various socially and economically weak backgrounds to get a decent education and respectful jobs.

Political background 
After taking a voluntary retirement from the IAS, Dr. Varaprasada Rao decided to take a plunge into politics. The Praja Rajyam Party (PRP) headed by Mr. Chiranjeevi offered him an M.P. seat from Tirupati along with a position of Vice-President of the party. He contested the 2009 general elections and lost. The PRP has now merged with the Congress Party.                     

During his association with PRP as Vice President, he was actively involved with the drafting of the Party Manifesto. Most of his views on the welfare of weaker sections, women and minorities were incorporated into the manifesto.

Dr Varaprasada Rao also undertook a Praja Sankalpa Yatra, along with the YSR Congress Party Chief YS Jagan Mohan Reddy. This padayatra, a mass outreach program which covered the length and breadth of the state, had an unprecedented public turnout where the leaders interacted with 1.25 crore people.

He also went on an indefinite hunger strike at Andhra Pradesh Bhavan over the demand of special category status to Andhra Pradesh. He fell ill during the fast and was admitted to the hospital, after which the fast was broken.

Dr. Rao has raised his concern over several issues in parliamentary sessions and debated strongly in support of dalits and women's causes.  He has also been strongly campaigning to set up a port in Dugarajapatnam in Nellore district.

References

India MPs 2014–2019
1953 births
Living people
Lok Sabha members from Andhra Pradesh
People from Tirupati
Telugu politicians
YSR Congress Party politicians
Praja Rajyam Party politicians
Andhra Pradesh MLAs 2019–2024